Boron is a chemical element with the symbol B and atomic number 5. In its crystalline form it is a brittle, dark, lustrous metalloid; in its amorphous form it is a brown powder. As the lightest element of the boron group it has three valence electrons for forming covalent bonds, resulting in many compounds such as boric acid, the mineral sodium borate, and the ultra-hard crystals of boron carbide and boron nitride.

Boron is synthesized entirely by cosmic ray spallation and supernovae and not by stellar nucleosynthesis, so it is a low-abundance element in the Solar System and in the Earth's crust. It constitutes about 0.001 percent by weight of Earth's crust. It is concentrated on Earth by the water-solubility of its more common naturally occurring compounds, the borate minerals. These are mined industrially as evaporites, such as borax and kernite. The largest known deposits are in Turkey, the largest producer of boron minerals.

Elemental boron is a metalloid that is found in small amounts in meteoroids but chemically uncombined boron is not otherwise found naturally on Earth. Industrially, the very pure element is produced with difficulty because of contamination by carbon or other elements that resist removal. Several allotropes exist: amorphous boron is a brown powder; crystalline boron is silvery to black, extremely hard (about 9.5 on the Mohs scale), and a poor electrical conductor at room temperature. The primary use of the element itself is as boron filaments with applications similar to carbon fibers in some high-strength materials.

Boron is primarily used in chemical compounds. About half of all production consumed globally is an additive in fiberglass for insulation and structural materials. The next leading use is in polymers and ceramics in high-strength, lightweight structural and heat-resistant materials. Borosilicate glass is desired for its greater strength and thermal shock resistance than ordinary soda lime glass. As sodium perborate, it is used as a bleach. A small amount is used as a dopant in semiconductors, and reagent intermediates in the synthesis of organic fine chemicals. A few boron-containing organic pharmaceuticals are used or are in study. Natural boron is composed of two stable isotopes, one of which (boron-10) has a number of uses as a neutron-capturing agent.

The intersection of boron with biology is very small.  Consensus on it as essential for mammalian life is lacking. Borates have low toxicity in mammals (similar to table salt) but are more toxic to arthropods and are occasionally used as insecticides. Boron-containing organic antibiotics are known. Although only traces are required, it is an essential plant nutrient.

History
The word boron was coined from borax, the mineral from which it was isolated, by analogy with carbon, which boron resembles chemically.

Borax in its mineral form (then known as tincal) first saw use as a glaze, beginning in China circa 300 AD. Some crude borax traveled westward, and was apparently mentioned by the alchemist Jabir ibn Hayyan around 700 AD. Marco Polo brought some glazes back to Italy in the 13th century. Georgius Agricola, in around 1600 AD, reported the use of borax as a flux in metallurgy. In 1777, boric acid was recognized in the hot springs (soffioni) near Florence, Italy, at which point it became known as sal sedativum, with ostensible medical benefits. The mineral was named sassolite, after Sasso Pisano in Italy. Sasso was the main source of European borax from 1827 to 1872, when American sources replaced it. Boron compounds were relatively rarely used until the late 1800s when Francis Marion Smith's Pacific Coast Borax Company first popularized and produced them in volume at low cost.

Boron was not recognized as an element until it was isolated by Sir Humphry Davy and by Joseph Louis Gay-Lussac and Louis Jacques Thénard. In 1808 Davy observed that electric current sent through a solution of borates produced a brown precipitate on one of the electrodes. In his subsequent experiments, he used potassium to reduce boric acid instead of electrolysis. He produced enough boron to confirm a new element and named it boracium. Gay-Lussac and Thénard used iron to reduce boric acid at high temperatures. By oxidizing boron with air, they showed that boric acid is its oxidation product. Jöns Jacob Berzelius identified it as an element in 1824. Pure boron was arguably first produced by the American chemist Ezekiel Weintraub in 1909.

Preparation of elemental boron in the laboratory
The earliest routes to elemental boron involved the reduction of boric oxide with metals such as magnesium or aluminium. However, the product is almost always contaminated with borides of those metals. Pure boron can be prepared by reducing volatile boron halides with hydrogen at high temperatures. Ultrapure boron for use in the semiconductor industry is produced by the decomposition of diborane at high temperatures and then further purified by the zone melting or Czochralski processes.

The production of boron compounds does not involve the formation of elemental boron, but exploits the convenient availability of borates.

Characteristics

Allotropes

Boron is similar to carbon in its capability to form stable covalently bonded molecular networks. Even nominally disordered (amorphous) boron contains regular boron icosahedra which are bonded randomly to each other without long-range order. Crystalline boron is a very hard, black material with a melting point of above 2000 °C. It forms four major allotropes: α-rhombohedral and β-rhombohedral (α-R and β-R), γ-orthorhombic (γ) and β-tetragonal (β-T). All four phases are stable at ambient conditions, and β-rhombohedral is the most common and stable. An α-tetragonal phase also exists (α-T), but is very difficult to produce without significant contamination. Most of the phases are based on B12 icosahedra, but the γ phase can be described as a rocksalt-type arrangement of the icosahedra and B2 atomic pairs. It can be produced by compressing other boron phases to 12–20 GPa and heating to 1500–1800 °C; it remains stable after releasing the temperature and pressure. The β-T phase is produced at similar pressures, but higher temperatures of 1800–2200 °C. The α-T and β-T phases might coexist at ambient conditions, with the β-T phase being the more stable. Compressing boron above 160 GPa produces a boron phase with an as yet unknown structure, and this phase is a superconductor at temperatures below 6–12 K. Borospherene (fullerene-like B40 molecules) and borophene (proposed graphene-like structure) were described in 2014.

Chemistry of the element

Elemental boron is rare and poorly studied because the pure material is extremely difficult to prepare. Most studies of "boron" involve samples that contain small amounts of carbon. The chemical behavior of boron resembles that of silicon more than aluminium. Crystalline boron is chemically inert and resistant to attack by boiling hydrofluoric or hydrochloric acid. When finely divided, it is attacked slowly by hot concentrated hydrogen peroxide, hot concentrated nitric acid, hot sulfuric acid or hot mixture of sulfuric and chromic acids.

The rate of oxidation of boron depends on the crystallinity, particle size, purity and temperature. Boron does not react with air at room temperature, but at higher temperatures it burns to form boron trioxide:
4 B + 3 O2 → 2 B2O3

Boron undergoes halogenation to give trihalides; for example,
2 B + 3 Br2 → 2 BBr3
The trichloride in practice is usually made from the oxide.

Atomic structure
Boron is the lightest element having an electron in a p-orbital in its ground state. But, unlike most other p-elements, it rarely obeys the octet rule and usually places only six electrons (in three molecular orbitals) onto its valence shell. Boron is the prototype for the boron group (the IUPAC group 13), although the other members of this group are metals and more typical p-elements (only aluminium to some extent shares boron's aversion to the octet rule).

Chemical compounds

In the most familiar compounds, boron has the formal oxidation state III. These include oxides, sulfides, nitrides, and halides.

The trihalides adopt a planar trigonal structure. These compounds are Lewis acids in that they readily form adducts with electron-pair donors, which are called Lewis bases. For example, fluoride (F−) and boron trifluoride (BF3) combined to give the tetrafluoroborate anion, BF4−. Boron trifluoride is used in the petrochemical industry as a catalyst. The halides react with water to form boric acid.

It is found in nature on Earth almost entirely as various oxides of B(III), often associated with other elements. More than one hundred borate minerals contain boron in oxidation state +3. These minerals resemble silicates in some respect, although it is often found not only in a tetrahedral coordination with oxygen, but also in a trigonal planar configuration. Unlike silicates, boron minerals never contain it with coordination number greater than four. A typical motif is exemplified by the tetraborate anions of the common mineral borax, shown at left. The formal negative charge of the tetrahedral borate center is balanced by metal cations in the minerals, such as the sodium (Na+) in borax. The tourmaline group of borate-silicates is also a very important boron-bearing mineral group, and a number of borosilicates are also known to exist naturally.

Boranes are chemical compounds of boron and hydrogen, with the generic formula of BxHy. These compounds do not occur in nature. Many of the boranes readily oxidise on contact with air, some violently. The parent member BH3 is called borane, but it is known only in the gaseous state, and dimerises to form diborane, B2H6. The larger boranes all consist of boron clusters that are polyhedral, some of which exist as isomers. For example, isomers of B20H26 are based on the fusion of two 10-atom clusters.

The most important boranes are diborane B2H6 and two of its pyrolysis products, pentaborane B5H9 and decaborane B10H14. A large number of anionic boron hydrides are known, e.g. [B12H12]2−.

The formal oxidation number in boranes is positive, and is based on the assumption that hydrogen is counted as −1 as in active metal hydrides. The mean oxidation number for the borons is then simply the ratio of hydrogen to boron in the molecule. For example, in diborane B2H6, the boron oxidation state is +3, but in decaborane B10H14, it is 7/5 or +1.4. In these compounds the oxidation state of boron is often not a whole number.

The boron nitrides are notable for the variety of structures that they adopt. They exhibit structures analogous to various allotropes of carbon, including graphite, diamond, and nanotubes. In the diamond-like structure, called cubic boron nitride (tradename Borazon), boron atoms exist in the tetrahedral structure of carbon atoms in diamond, but one in every four B-N bonds can be viewed as a coordinate covalent bond, wherein two electrons are donated by the nitrogen atom which acts as the Lewis base to a bond to the Lewis acidic boron(III) centre. Cubic boron nitride, among other applications, is used as an abrasive, as it has a hardness comparable with diamond (the two substances are able to produce scratches on each other). In the BN compound analogue of graphite, hexagonal boron nitride (h-BN), the positively charged boron and negatively charged nitrogen atoms in each plane lie adjacent to the oppositely charged atom in the next plane. Consequently, graphite and h-BN have very different properties, although both are lubricants, as these planes slip past each other easily. However, h-BN is a relatively poor electrical and thermal conductor in the planar directions.

Organoboron chemistry

A large number of organoboron compounds are known and many are useful in organic synthesis. Many are produced from hydroboration, which employs diborane, B2H6, a simple borane chemical. Organoboron(III) compounds are usually tetrahedral or trigonal planar, for example, tetraphenylborate, [B(C6H5)4]− vs. triphenylborane, B(C6H5)3. However, multiple boron atoms reacting with each other have a tendency to form novel dodecahedral (12-sided) and icosahedral (20-sided) structures composed completely of boron atoms, or with varying numbers of carbon heteroatoms.

Organoboron chemicals have been employed in uses as diverse as boron carbide (see below), a complex very hard ceramic composed of boron-carbon cluster anions and cations, to carboranes, carbon-boron cluster chemistry compounds that can be halogenated to form reactive structures including carborane acid, a superacid. As one example, carboranes form useful molecular moieties that add considerable amounts of boron to other biochemicals in order to synthesize boron-containing compounds for boron neutron capture therapy for cancer.

Compounds of B(I) and B(II)
As anticipated by its hydride clusters, boron forms a variety of stable compounds with formal oxidation state less than three. B2F4 and B4Cl4 are well characterized.

Binary metal-boron compounds, the metal borides, contain boron in negative oxidation states. Illustrative is magnesium diboride (MgB2). Each boron atom has a formal −1 charge and magnesium is assigned a formal charge of +2. In this material, the boron centers are trigonal planar with an extra double bond for each boron, forming sheets akin to the carbon in graphite. However, unlike hexagonal boron nitride, which lacks electrons in the plane of the covalent atoms, the delocalized electrons in magnesium diboride allow it to conduct electricity similar to isoelectronic graphite. In 2001, this material was found to be a high-temperature superconductor. It is a superconductor under active development. A project at CERN to make MgB2 cables has resulted in superconducting test cables able to carry 20,000 amperes for extremely high current distribution applications, such as the contemplated high luminosity version of the large hadron collider.

Certain other metal borides find specialized applications as hard materials for cutting tools. Often the boron in borides has fractional oxidation states, such as −1/3 in calcium hexaboride (CaB6).

From the structural perspective, the most distinctive chemical compounds of boron are the hydrides. Included in this series are the cluster compounds dodecaborate, decaborane (B10H14), and the carboranes such as C2B10H12. Characteristically such compounds contain boron with coordination numbers greater than four.

Isotopes

Boron has two naturally occurring and stable isotopes, 11B (80.1%) and 10B (19.9%). The mass difference results in a wide range of δ11B values, which are defined as a fractional difference between the 11B and 10B and traditionally expressed in parts per thousand, in natural waters ranging from −16 to +59. There are 13 known isotopes of boron; the shortest-lived isotope is 7B which decays through proton emission and alpha decay with a half-life of 3.5×10−22 s. Isotopic fractionation of boron is controlled by the exchange reactions of the boron species B(OH)3 and [B(OH)4]−. Boron isotopes are also fractionated during mineral crystallization, during H2O phase changes in hydrothermal systems, and during hydrothermal alteration of rock. The latter effect results in preferential removal of the [10B(OH)4]− ion onto clays. It results in solutions enriched in 11B(OH)3 and therefore may be responsible for the large 11B enrichment in seawater relative to both oceanic crust and continental crust; this difference may act as an isotopic signature.

The exotic 17B exhibits a nuclear halo, i.e. its radius is appreciably larger than that predicted by the liquid drop model.

The 10B isotope is useful for capturing thermal neutrons (see neutron cross section#Typical cross sections). The nuclear industry enriches natural boron to nearly pure 10B. The less-valuable by-product, depleted boron, is nearly pure 11B.

Commercial isotope enrichment
Because of its high neutron cross-section, boron-10 is often used to control fission in nuclear reactors as a neutron-capturing substance. Several industrial-scale enrichment processes have been developed; however, only the fractionated vacuum distillation of the dimethyl ether adduct of boron trifluoride (DME-BF3) and column chromatography of borates are being used.

Enriched boron (boron-10)

Enriched boron or 10B is used in both radiation shielding and is the primary nuclide used in neutron capture therapy of cancer. In the latter ("boron neutron capture therapy" or BNCT), a compound containing 10B is incorporated into a pharmaceutical which is selectively taken up by a malignant tumor and tissues near it. The patient is then treated with a beam of low energy neutrons at a relatively low neutron radiation dose. The neutrons, however, trigger energetic and short-range secondary alpha particle and lithium-7 heavy ion radiation that are products of the boron + neutron nuclear reaction, and this ion radiation additionally bombards the tumor, especially from inside the tumor cells.

In nuclear reactors, 10B is used for reactivity control and in emergency shutdown systems. It can serve either function in the form of borosilicate control rods or as boric acid. In pressurized water reactors, 10B boric acid is added to the reactor coolant when the plant is shut down for refueling. It is then slowly filtered out over many months as fissile material is used up and the fuel becomes less reactive.

In future crewed interplanetary spacecraft, 10B has a theoretical role as structural material (as boron fibers or BN nanotube material) which would also serve a special role in the radiation shield. One of the difficulties in dealing with cosmic rays, which are mostly high energy protons, is that some secondary radiation from interaction of cosmic rays and spacecraft materials is high energy spallation neutrons. Such neutrons can be moderated by materials high in light elements, such as polyethylene, but the moderated neutrons continue to be a radiation hazard unless actively absorbed in the shielding. Among light elements that absorb thermal neutrons, 6Li and 10B appear as potential spacecraft structural materials which serve both for mechanical reinforcement and radiation protection.

Depleted boron (boron-11)

Radiation-hardened semiconductors 
Cosmic radiation will produce secondary neutrons if it hits spacecraft structures. Those neutrons will be captured in 10B, if it is present in the spacecraft's semiconductors, producing a gamma ray, an alpha particle, and a lithium ion. Those resultant decay products may then irradiate nearby semiconductor "chip" structures, causing data loss (bit flipping, or single event upset). In radiation-hardened semiconductor designs, one countermeasure is to use depleted boron, which is greatly enriched in 11B and contains almost no 10B. This is useful because 11B is largely immune to radiation damage. Depleted boron is a byproduct of the nuclear industry (see above).

Proton-boron fusion 

11B is also a candidate as a fuel for aneutronic fusion. When struck by a proton with energy of about 500 keV, it produces three alpha particles and 8.7 MeV of energy. Most other fusion reactions involving hydrogen and helium produce penetrating neutron radiation, which weakens reactor structures and induces long-term radioactivity, thereby endangering operating personnel. The alpha particles from 11B fusion can be turned directly into electric power, and all radiation stops as soon as the reactor is turned off.

NMR spectroscopy
Both 10B and 11B possess nuclear spin. These isotopes are, therefore, of use in nuclear magnetic resonance spectroscopy; and spectrometers specially adapted to detecting the boron-11 nuclei are available commercially. The 10B and 11B nuclei also cause splitting in the resonances of attached nuclei.

Occurrence

Boron is rare in the Universe and solar system due to trace formation in the Big Bang and in stars. It is formed in minor amounts in cosmic ray spallation nucleosynthesis and may be found uncombined in cosmic dust and meteoroid materials.

In the high oxygen environment of Earth, boron is always found fully oxidized to borate. Boron does not appear on Earth in elemental form. Extremely small traces of elemental boron were detected in Lunar regolith.

Although boron is a relatively rare element in the Earth's crust, representing only 0.001% of the crust mass, it can be highly concentrated by the action of water, in which many borates are soluble.
It is found naturally combined in compounds such as borax and boric acid (sometimes found in volcanic spring waters). About a hundred borate minerals are known.

On 5 September 2017, scientists reported that the Curiosity rover detected boron, an essential ingredient for life on Earth, on the planet Mars. Such a finding, along with previous discoveries that water may have been present on ancient Mars, further supports the possible early habitability of Gale Crater on Mars.

Production
Economically important sources of boron are the minerals colemanite, rasorite (kernite), ulexite and tincal. Together these constitute 90% of mined boron-containing ore. The largest global borax deposits known, many still untapped, are in Central and Western Turkey, including the provinces of Eskişehir, Kütahya and Balıkesir. Global proven boron mineral mining reserves exceed one billion metric tonnes, against a yearly production of about four million tonnes.

Turkey and the United States are the largest producers of boron products. Turkey produces about half of the global yearly demand, through Eti Mine Works a Turkish state-owned mining and chemicals company focusing on boron products. It holds a government monopoly on the mining of borate minerals in Turkey, which possesses 72% of the world's known deposits. In 2012, it held a 47% share of production of global borate minerals, ahead of its main competitor, Rio Tinto Group.

Almost a quarter (23%) of global boron production comes from the single Rio Tinto Borax Mine (also known as the U.S. Borax Boron Mine)  near Boron, California.

Market trend
The average cost of crystalline elemental boron is US$5/g. Elemental boron is chiefly used in making boron fibers, where it is deposited by chemical vapor deposition on a tungsten core (see below). Boron fibers are used in lightweight composite applications, such as high strength tapes. This use is a very small fraction of total boron use. Boron is introduced into semiconductors as boron compounds, by ion implantation.

Estimated global consumption of boron (almost entirely as boron compounds) was about 4 million tonnes of B2O3 in 2012. As compounds such as borax and kernite its cost was US$377/tonne in 2019. Boron mining and refining capacities are considered to be adequate to meet expected levels of growth through the next decade.

The form in which boron is consumed has changed in recent years. The use of ores like colemanite has declined following concerns over arsenic content. Consumers have moved toward the use of refined borates and boric acid that have a lower pollutant content.

Increasing demand for boric acid has led a number of producers to invest in additional capacity. Turkey's state-owned Eti Mine Works opened a new boric acid plant with the production capacity of 100,000 tonnes per year at Emet in 2003. Rio Tinto Group increased the capacity of its boron plant from 260,000 tonnes per year in 2003 to 310,000 tonnes per year by May 2005, with plans to grow this to 366,000 tonnes per year in 2006. Chinese boron producers have been unable to meet rapidly growing demand for high quality borates. This has led to imports of sodium tetraborate (borax) growing by a hundredfold between 2000 and 2005 and boric acid imports increasing by 28% per year over the same period.

The rise in global demand has been driven by high growth rates in glass fiber, fiberglass and borosilicate glassware production. A rapid increase in the manufacture of reinforcement-grade boron-containing fiberglass in Asia, has offset the development of boron-free reinforcement-grade fiberglass in Europe and the US. The recent rises in energy prices may lead to greater use of insulation-grade fiberglass, with consequent growth in the boron consumption. Roskill Consulting Group forecasts that world demand for boron will grow by 3.4% per year to reach 21 million tonnes by 2010. The highest growth in demand is expected to be in Asia where demand could rise by an average 5.7% per year.

Applications

Nearly all boron ore extracted from the Earth is destined for refinement into boric acid and sodium tetraborate pentahydrate. In the United States, 70% of the boron is used for the production of glass and ceramics.
The major global industrial-scale use of boron compounds (about 46% of end-use) is in production of glass fiber for boron-containing insulating and structural fiberglasses, especially in Asia. Boron is added to the glass as borax pentahydrate or boron oxide, to influence the strength or fluxing qualities of the glass fibers. Another 10% of global boron production is for borosilicate glass as used in high strength glassware. About 15% of global boron is used in boron ceramics, including super-hard materials discussed below. Agriculture consumes 11% of global boron production, and bleaches and detergents about 6%.

Elemental boron fiber
Boron fibers (boron filaments) are high-strength, lightweight materials that are used chiefly for advanced aerospace structures as a component of composite materials, as well as limited production consumer and sporting goods such as golf clubs and fishing rods. The fibers can be produced by chemical vapor deposition of boron on a tungsten filament.

Boron fibers and sub-millimeter sized crystalline boron springs are produced by laser-assisted chemical vapor deposition. Translation of the focused laser beam allows production of even complex helical structures. Such structures show good mechanical properties (elastic modulus 450 GPa, fracture strain 3.7%, fracture stress 17 GPa) and can be applied as reinforcement of ceramics or in micromechanical systems.

Boronated fiberglass 

Fiberglass is a fiber reinforced polymer made of plastic reinforced by glass fibers, commonly woven into a mat. The glass fibers used in the material are made of various types of glass depending upon the fiberglass use. These glasses all contain silica or silicate, with varying amounts of oxides of calcium, magnesium, and sometimes boron. The boron is present as borosilicate, borax, or boron oxide, and is added to increase the strength of the glass, or as a fluxing agent to decrease the melting temperature of silica, which is too high to be easily worked in its pure form to make glass fibers.

The highly boronated glasses used in fiberglass are E-glass (named for "Electrical" use, but now the most common fiberglass for general use). E-glass is alumino-borosilicate glass with less than 1% w/w alkali oxides, mainly used for glass-reinforced plastics. Other common high-boron glasses include C-glass, an alkali-lime glass with high boron oxide content, used for glass staple fibers and insulation, and D-glass, a borosilicate glass, named for its low dielectric constant).

Not all fiberglasses contain boron, but on a global scale, most of the fiberglass used does contain it. Because the ubiquitous use of fiberglass in construction and insulation, boron-containing fiberglasses consume half the global production of boron, and are the single largest commercial boron market.

Borosilicate glass

Borosilicate glass, which is typically 12–15% B2O3, 80% SiO2, and 2% Al2O3, has a low coefficient of thermal expansion, giving it a good resistance to thermal shock. Schott AG's "Duran" and Owens-Corning's trademarked Pyrex are two major brand names for this glass, used both in laboratory glassware and in consumer cookware and bakeware, chiefly for this resistance.

Boron carbide ceramic

Several boron compounds are known for their extreme hardness and toughness.
Boron carbide is a ceramic material which is obtained by decomposing B2O3 with carbon in an electric furnace:
2 B2O3 + 7 C → B4C + 6 CO

Boron carbide's structure is only approximately B4C, and it shows a clear depletion of carbon from this suggested stoichiometric ratio. This is due to its very complex structure. The substance can be seen with empirical formula B12C3 (i.e., with B12 dodecahedra being a motif), but with less carbon, as the suggested C3 units are replaced with C-B-C chains, and some smaller (B6) octahedra are present as well (see the boron carbide article for structural analysis). The repeating polymer plus semi-crystalline structure of boron carbide gives it great structural strength per weight. It is used in tank armor, bulletproof vests, and numerous other structural applications.

Boron carbide's ability to absorb neutrons without forming long-lived radionuclides (especially when doped with extra boron-10) makes the material attractive as an absorbent for neutron radiation arising in nuclear power plants. Nuclear applications of boron carbide include shielding, control rods and shut-down pellets. Within control rods, boron carbide is often powdered, to increase its surface area.

High-hardness and abrasive compounds

Boron carbide and cubic boron nitride powders are widely used as abrasives. Boron nitride is a material isoelectronic to carbon. Similar to carbon, it has both hexagonal (soft graphite-like h-BN) and cubic (hard, diamond-like c-BN) forms. h-BN is used as a high temperature component and lubricant. c-BN, also known under commercial name borazon, is a superior abrasive. Its hardness is only slightly smaller than, but its chemical stability is superior, to that of diamond. Heterodiamond (also called BCN) is another diamond-like boron compound.

Metallurgy

Boron is added to boron steels at the level of a few parts per million to increase hardenability. Higher percentages are added to steels used in the nuclear industry due to boron's neutron absorption ability.

Boron can also increase the surface hardness of steels and alloys through boriding. Additionally metal borides are used for coating tools through chemical vapor deposition or physical vapor deposition. Implantation of boron ions into metals and alloys, through ion implantation or ion beam deposition, results in a spectacular increase in surface resistance and microhardness. Laser alloying has also been successfully used for the same purpose. These borides are an alternative to diamond coated tools, and their (treated) surfaces have similar properties to those of the bulk boride.

For example, rhenium diboride can be produced at ambient pressures, but is rather expensive because of rhenium. The hardness of ReB2 exhibits considerable anisotropy because of its hexagonal layered structure. Its value is comparable to that of tungsten carbide, silicon carbide, titanium diboride or zirconium diboride.
Similarly, AlMgB14 + TiB2 composites possess high hardness and wear resistance and are used in either bulk form or as coatings for components exposed to high temperatures and wear loads.

Detergent formulations and bleaching agents
Borax is used in various household laundry and cleaning products, including the "20 Mule Team Borax" laundry booster and "Boraxo" powdered hand soap. It is also present in some tooth bleaching formulas.

Sodium perborate serves as a source of active oxygen in many detergents, laundry detergents, cleaning products, and laundry bleaches. However, despite its name, "Borateem" laundry bleach no longer contains any boron compounds, using sodium percarbonate instead as a bleaching agent.

Insecticides
Boric acid is used as an insecticide, notably against ants, fleas, and cockroaches.

Semiconductors
Boron is a useful dopant for such semiconductors as silicon, germanium, and silicon carbide. Having one fewer valence electron than the host atom, it donates a hole resulting in p-type conductivity. Traditional method of introducing boron into semiconductors is via its atomic diffusion at high temperatures. This process uses either solid (B2O3), liquid (BBr3), or gaseous boron sources (B2H6 or BF3). However, after the 1970s, it was mostly replaced by ion implantation, which relies mostly on BF3 as a boron source. Boron trichloride gas is also an important chemical in semiconductor industry, however, not for doping but rather for plasma etching of metals and their oxides. Triethylborane is also injected into vapor deposition reactors as a boron source. Examples are the plasma deposition of boron-containing hard carbon films, silicon nitride–boron nitride films, and for doping of diamond film with boron.

Magnets
Boron is a component of neodymium magnets (Nd2Fe14B), which are among the strongest type of permanent magnet. These magnets are found in a variety of electromechanical and electronic devices, such as magnetic resonance imaging (MRI) medical imaging systems, in compact and relatively small motors and actuators. As examples, computer HDDs (hard disk drives), CD (compact disk) and DVD (digital versatile disk) players rely on neodymium magnet motors to deliver intense rotary power in a remarkably compact package. In mobile phones 'Neo' magnets provide the magnetic field which allows tiny speakers to deliver appreciable audio power.

Shielding and neutron absorber in nuclear reactors
Boron shielding is used as a control for nuclear reactors, taking advantage of its high cross-section for neutron capture.

In pressurized water reactors a variable concentration of boronic acid in the cooling water is used as a neutron poison to compensate the variable reactivity of the fuel. When new rods are inserted the concentration of boronic acid is maximal, and is reduced during the lifetime.

Other nonmedical uses

 Because of its distinctive green flame, amorphous boron is used in pyrotechnic flares.
 In the 1950s, there were several studies of the use of boranes as energy-increasing "Zip fuel" additives for jet fuel.
 Starch and casein-based adhesives contain sodium tetraborate decahydrate (Na2B4O7·10 H2O)
 Some anti-corrosion systems contain borax.
 Sodium borates are used as a flux for soldering silver and gold and with ammonium chloride for welding ferrous metals. They are also fire retarding additives to plastics and rubber articles.
 Boric acid (also known as orthoboric acid) H3BO3 is used in the production of textile fiberglass and flat panel displays and in many PVAc- and PVOH-based adhesives.
 Triethylborane is a substance which ignites the JP-7 fuel of the Pratt & Whitney J58 turbojet/ramjet engines powering the Lockheed SR-71 Blackbird. It was also used to ignite the F-1 Engines on the Saturn V Rocket utilized by NASA's Apollo and Skylab programs from 1967 until 1973. Today SpaceX uses it to ignite the engines on their Falcon 9 rocket. Triethylborane is suitable for this because of its pyrophoric properties, especially the fact that it burns with a very high temperature. Triethylborane is an industrial initiator in radical reactions, where it is effective even at low temperatures.
 Borates are used as environmentally benign wood preservatives.

Pharmaceutical and biological applications
Boric acid has antiseptic, antifungal, and antiviral properties and for these reasons is applied as a water clarifier in swimming pool water treatment. Mild solutions of boric acid have been used as eye antiseptics.

Bortezomib (marketed as Velcade and Cytomib). Boron appears as an active element in the organic pharmaceutical bortezomib, a new class of drug called the proteasome inhibitor, for the treatment of myeloma and one form of lymphoma (it is in currently in experimental trials against other types of lymphoma). The boron atom in bortezomib binds the catalytic site of the 26S proteasome with high affinity and specificity.
 A number of potential boronated pharmaceuticals using boron-10, have been prepared for use in boron neutron capture therapy (BNCT).
 Some boron compounds show promise in treating arthritis, though none have as yet been generally approved for the purpose.

Tavaborole (marketed as Kerydin) is an Aminoacyl tRNA synthetase inhibitor which is used to treat toenail fungus. It gained FDA approval in July 2014.

Dioxaborolane chemistry enables radioactive fluoride (18F) labeling of antibodies or red blood cells, which allows for positron emission tomography (PET) imaging of cancer and hemorrhages, respectively. A Human-Derived, Genetic, Positron-emitting and Fluorescent (HD-GPF) reporter system uses a human protein, PSMA and non-immunogenic, and a small molecule that is positron-emitting (boron bound 18F) and fluorescence for dual modality PET and fluorescent imaging of genome modified cells, e.g. cancer, CRISPR/Cas9, or CAR T-cells, in an entire mouse. The dual-modality small molecule targeting PSMA was tested in humans and found the location of primary and metastatic prostate cancer, fluorescence-guided removal of cancer, and detects single cancer cells in tissue margins.

Research areas
Magnesium diboride is an important superconducting material with the transition temperature of 39 K. MgB2 wires are produced with the powder-in-tube process and applied in superconducting magnets.

Amorphous boron is used as a melting point depressant in nickel-chromium braze alloys.

Hexagonal boron nitride forms atomically thin layers, which have been used to enhance the electron mobility in graphene devices. It also forms nanotubular structures (BNNTs), which have high strength, high chemical stability, and high thermal conductivity, among its list of desirable properties.

Biological role

Boron is an essential plant nutrient, required primarily for maintaining the integrity of cell walls. However, high soil concentrations of greater than 1.0 ppm lead to marginal and tip necrosis in leaves as well as poor overall growth performance. Levels as low as 0.8 ppm produce these same symptoms in plants that are particularly sensitive to boron in the soil. Nearly all plants, even those somewhat tolerant of soil boron, will show at least some symptoms of boron toxicity when soil boron content is greater than 1.8 ppm. When this content exceeds 2.0 ppm, few plants will perform well and some may not survive.

It is thought that boron plays several essential roles in animals, including humans, but the exact physiological role is poorly understood. A small human trial published in 1987 reported on postmenopausal women first made boron deficient and then repleted with 3 mg/day. Boron supplementation markedly reduced urinary calcium excretion and elevated the serum concentrations of 17 beta-estradiol and testosterone.

The U.S. Institute of Medicine has not confirmed that boron is an essential nutrient for humans, so neither a Recommended Dietary Allowance (RDA) nor an Adequate Intake have been established. Adult dietary intake is estimated at 0.9 to 1.4 mg/day, with about 90% absorbed. What is absorbed is mostly excreted in urine. The Tolerable Upper Intake Level for adults is 20 mg/day.

In 2013, a hypothesis suggested it was possible that boron and molybdenum catalyzed the production of RNA on Mars with life being transported to Earth via a meteorite around 3 billion years ago.

There exist several known boron-containing natural antibiotics. The first one found was boromycin, isolated from streptomyces.

Congenital endothelial dystrophy type 2, a rare form of corneal dystrophy, is linked to mutations in SLC4A11 gene that encodes a transporter reportedly regulating the intracellular concentration of boron.

Analytical quantification
For determination of boron content in food or materials, the colorimetric curcumin method is used. Boron is converted to boric acid or borates and on reaction with curcumin in acidic solution, a red colored boron-chelate complex, rosocyanine, is formed.

Health issues and toxicity

Elemental boron, boron oxide, boric acid, borates, and many organoboron compounds are relatively nontoxic to humans and animals (with toxicity similar to that of table salt). The LD50 (dose at which there is 50% mortality) for animals is about 6 g per kg of body weight. Substances with LD50 above 2 g/kg are considered nontoxic. An intake of 4 g/day of boric acid was reported without incident, but more than this is considered toxic in more than a few doses. Intakes of more than 0.5 grams per day for 50 days cause minor digestive and other problems suggestive of toxicity. Dietary supplementation of boron may be helpful for bone growth, wound healing, and antioxidant activity, and insufficient amount of boron in diet may result in boron deficiency.

Single medical doses of 20 g of boric acid for neutron capture therapy have been used without undue toxicity.

Boric acid is more toxic to insects than to mammals, and is routinely used as an insecticide.

The boranes (boron hydrogen compounds) and similar gaseous compounds are quite poisonous. As usual, boron is not an element that is intrinsically poisonous, but the toxicity of these compounds depends on structure (for another example of this phenomenon, see phosphine). The boranes are also highly flammable and require special care when handling, some combinations of boranes and other compounds are highly explosive. Sodium borohydride presents a fire hazard owing to its reducing nature and the liberation of hydrogen on contact with acid. Boron halides are corrosive.

Boron is necessary for plant growth, but an excess of boron is toxic to plants, and occurs particularly in acidic soil. It presents as a yellowing from the tip inwards of the oldest leaves and black spots in barley leaves, but it can be confused with other stresses such as magnesium deficiency in other plants.

See also

 Allotropes of boron
 Boron deficiency
 Boron oxide
 Boron nitride
 Boron neutron capture therapy
 Boronic acid
 Hydroboration-oxidation reaction
 Suzuki coupling

References

External links
 Boron at The Periodic Table of Videos (University of Nottingham)
 J. B. Calvert: Boron, 2004, private website (archived version)

 
Chemical elements
Metalloids
Neutron poisons
Pyrotechnic fuels
Rocket fuels
Nuclear fusion fuels
Dietary minerals
Reducing agents
Articles containing video clips
Chemical elements with rhombohedral structure